Nicolas Mejri (born 27 May 2000) is a Slovak footballer who plays for ŠK Prameň Kováčová as a midfielder.

Club career

Železiarne Podbrezová
Mejri made his Fortuna Liga debut for Železiarne Podbrezová against Nitra on 9 December 2017. He replaced Endy Bernadina some 13 minutes before the end and had contributed to defending the 1-0 lead from the first half.

References

External links
 FK Železiarne Podbrezová official club profile 
 
 Futbalnet profile 
 

2000 births
Living people
Footballers from Prague
Slovak footballers
Slovakia youth international footballers
Association football midfielders
FK Železiarne Podbrezová players
ŠK Prameň Kováčová players
Slovak Super Liga players
2. Liga (Slovakia) players
3. Liga (Slovakia) players